Heydrich is a German surname.  Notable people with the surname include:

Reinhard Heydrich (1904–1942), high-ranking German Nazi official during World War II and a major perpetrator of the Holocaust
Heinz Heydrich (1905–1944), younger brother of Reinhard Heydrich
Lina Heydrich (1911–1985), wife of Reinhard Heydrich
Richard Bruno Heydrich (1865–1938), German opera singer and composer, father of Reinhard Heydrich

See also
Heidrich
Hydrick

German-language surnames